The Powerdrive was a three-wheeled microcar with a rear-mounted  Anzani two cylinder, two stroke  engine.

The car was designed by David Gottlieb, whose Powerdrive company had previously worked with the Allard Motor Company on the development of the abortive Allard Clipper. Physically, the Powerdrive was larger than other cars in this class, with full-size 13-inch wheels and a large amount of luggage space at both the front and rear. The car's design and styling attracted much praise at its launch at the Dorchester Hotel in London in July 1955.

References

External links
1956 Powerdrive

Defunct motor vehicle manufacturers of England
Car manufacturers of the United Kingdom
Microcars
Three-wheeled motor vehicles
Motor vehicle manufacturers based in London
Cars introduced in 1955